Layang-Layang Airport (English: Swallow Reef Airport) is located on Swallow Reef (Pulau Layang-Layang) in the Spratly Islands of the South China Sea. The airport serves a Royal Malaysian Navy naval station (Station Lima) and a 3-star diving resort as well as a marine research facility, MARSAL (Marine Research Station Pulau Layang-Layang).

Background 
The runway's original length was 1,064 metres, but is now  after an extension was completed in 2003. The airport was built in the period 1991 to 1995 by the Malaysian Government as part of a plan to exploit the tourism potential of the island. The island is administrated by Malaysia, but as with all of the Spratly Islands, is disputed territory.

Airlines and destinations

Facilities 
The airport consists of a paved runway, two hangars, a radar station, a control tower and watchtowers. The concrete runway is 1367m long, 28m wide, and has a Pavement Classification Number of 032RBXU, indicating a medium strength rigid pavement, with a high maximum tire pressure.

The airport is dual-use, serving both military and civilian aircraft. Layang Layang Aerospace operates Nomad N22C aircraft to and from Kota Kinabalu International Airport. The Royal Malaysian Air Force operates C130 Hercules transport planes and CN-235 maritime patrol aircraft to and from Labuan Airport.

Currently MASwings operates seasonal charter flights to the airport during the dry season using ATR72-500.

See also 
 Dongsha Island Airport (Pratas Island)
 Yongxing Island Airport (Woody Island in the Paracel Islands)
 List of airports in the Spratly Islands
 List of maritime features in the Spratly Islands
 Taiping Island Airport

References

Infobox information source: http://www.airports-worldwide.com/spratly_islands/swallow_reef_spratly_islands.php
Most parts of article head, background and facilities sections are taken from article: Swallow Reef.

Airports in Malaysia
Airports in the Spratly Islands